Sergei Aleksandrovich Glazyukov (born 23 September 1986) is a former Russian professional football player.

Club career
He played in the Russian Football National League for FC Nosta Novotroitsk in 2009.

External links
 
 

1986 births
Living people
Russian footballers
Association football forwards
FC Petrotrest players
FC Rotor Volgograd players
FC Dynamo Stavropol players
FC Okzhetpes players
FC Vitebsk players
FC Dynamo Vologda players
Kazakhstan Premier League players
Belarusian Premier League players
Russian expatriate footballers
Expatriate footballers in Kazakhstan
Expatriate footballers in Belarus
Russian expatriate sportspeople in Kazakhstan
Russian expatriate sportspeople in Belarus
FC Nosta Novotroitsk players